Nagendra Pratap Singh Patel is an Indian politician and Member of Parliament from Phulpur parliamentary constituency.

References

|-

1968 births
Living people
Samajwadi Party politicians
Lok Sabha members from Uttar Pradesh
Politicians from Allahabad
Apna Dal (Sonelal) politicians